Kristine Levine (born August 17, 1970) is an American comedian, actor, and author best known for performing in the sketch comedy television series Portlandia.

Filmography

Film 
 The Unbookables (2012, as self)
 Welcome to Bridgetown (2015, as self)

Television 
 Portlandia (2011–2016, 10 episodes)
Life is Ass

Stage performances 
 Fat Whore (2012)
 Critical Comedy (2017)

References

External links 
 

1970 births
American women comedians
American stand-up comedians
American television actresses
Living people
21st-century American comedians
Stand Up! Records artists
21st-century American actresses